Vivian Walsh may refer to:

 Vivian Walsh (author), children's book author
 Vivian Walsh (aviator) (1888–1950), New Zealand aviator and engineer
 Vivian P. Walsh (author), author of ''Diary of an Oxygen Thief''